Anton Hellinger (16 December 1925 – 19 September 2019), known as Bert Hellinger, was a German psychotherapist associated with a therapeutic method best known as Family Constellations and Systemic Constellations. In recent years, his work evolved beyond these formats into what he called Movements of the Spirit-Mind. Several thousand professional practitioners worldwide, influenced by Hellinger, but not necessarily following him, continue to apply and adapt his original insights to a broad range of personal, organizational and political applications.

Life

Anton Hellinger was born into a Catholic family in Leimen, Baden, Germany, in 1925. Hellinger stated that his parents' "particular form of Catholic faith provided the entire family with immunity against believing the distortions of National Socialism."  At age 10, he left his family to attend a Catholic convent school run by the Order of the Jesuits in which he was later ordained and that sent him to South Africa as a missionary.

The local Hitler Youth Organization tried without success to recruit the teenage Bert Hellinger.  This resulted in his being classified as 'Suspected of Being an Enemy of the People' In 1942, Hellinger was conscripted into the German army.  He saw combat on the Western front.  In 1945, he was captured and imprisoned in an Allied P.O.W. camp in Belgium.  After escaping from the P.O.W. camp, Hellinger made his way back to Germany. Hellinger entered the Jesuits (Society of Jesus), a Catholic religious order, taking the religious name Suitbert, which is the source of his first name "Bert".  He studied philosophy and theology at the University of Würzburg en route to his ordination as a priest.  In the early 1950s, he was dispatched to South Africa where he was assigned to be a missionary to the Zulus.  There he continued his studies at the University of Pietermaritzburg and the University of South Africa where he received a B.A. and a University Education Diploma, which entitled him to teach at public high schools.
  
Hellinger lived in South Africa for 16 years.  During these years he served as a parish priest, teacher and, finally, as headmaster of a large school.  He also had administrative responsibility for the entire diocesan district containing 150 schools.  He became fluent in the Zulu language, participated in Zulu rituals, and gained an appreciation for the Zulu worldview.

His participation in a series of interracial, ecumenical training in group dynamics led by Anglican clergy in South Africa in the early 1960s laid the groundwork for his leaving the Catholic priesthood.  From his point of view, the trainers worked from a phenomenological orientation -- they were concerned with recognizing what is essential out of all the diversity present, without intention, without fear, without preconceptions, relying purely on what appears.  He was deeply impressed by the way their methods showed it was possible for opposites to become reconciled through mutual respect.

The beginning of his interest in phenomenology coincided with the unfolding dissolution of his vows to the priesthood.  Hellinger told how one of the trainers asked the group, "What is more important to you, your ideals or people?  Which would you sacrifice for the other?" This was not merely a philosophical riddle to him.  He was acutely sensitive to how the Nazi regime sacrificed human beings in service of ideals.  He said, "In a sense, the question changed my life.  A fundamental orientation toward people has shaped all my work since."

After leaving the priesthood, he met his first wife, Herta, and was married, shortly after returning to Germany. He spent several years in the early 1970s in Vienna training in a classical course in psychoanalysis at the Wiener Arbeitskreis für Tiefenpsychologie (Viennese Association for Depth Psychology).  He completed his training at the Münchner Arbeitsgemeinschaft für Psychoanalyse (Munich Psychoanalytic Training Institute) and was accepted as a practicing member of their professional association.

In 1973, he left Germany for a second time and traveled to the United States to be trained for 9 months by Arthur Janov.  There were many important influences that shaped his approach.  One of the most significant was Eric Berne and Transactional Analysis.

Nearing age 70, he had neither documented his insights and approach nor trained students to carry on his methods.  He agreed for German psychiatrist Gunthard Weber to record and edit a series of workshop transcripts.  Weber published the book himself in 1993 under the title Zweierlei Glück [Capricious Good Fortune; aka Second Chance]. In 2017 this book had its 18th edition.

 Hellinger had published more than 90 books, 70 of them listed in the catalog of the German National Library (Deutsche National-Bibliothek, Leipzig). About half his publishing's are documentaries on his family constellation work, again as workshop transcripts. The other half presents his philosophy.

Hellinger traveled widely, delivering lectures, workshops, and training courses throughout Europe, the United States, Central, and South America, Russia, China, and Japan. Hellinger alienated some potential colleagues and supporters by his idiosyncratic behavior, such as making sweeping statements that reduced complex issues to single root causes or his manner of sometimes addressing clients in a caustic, authoritarian tone.  Many practitioners distance themselves from the method's founding figure.  Many others continued their association, integrating the further developments into their own practices.

Until his death on 19 September 2019, Hellinger operated the Hellinger School with his second wife, Maria Sophie Hellinger.

Works
Hellinger published more than 30 books with combined sales of one million copies in at least ten languages.  Some of his books translated into English include:

 Hellinger, B. (2001).  Love's own truths: Bonding and balancing in close relationships (M. Oberli-Turner & H. Beaumont, Trans.).  Phoenix, AZ: Zeig, Tucker & Theisen.
 Hellinger, B. (2002).  Insights: Lectures and stories.  (J. ten Herkel, Trans.). Heidelberg, Germany: Carl-Auer-Systeme Verlag.
 Hellinger, B. (2002). On life & other paradoxes: Aphorisms and little stories from Bert Hellinger (R. Metzner, Trans.). Phoenix, AZ: Zeig, Tucker & Theisen.
 Hellinger, B. (2003). Farewell family constellations with descendants of victims and perpetrators (C. Beaumont, Trans.). Heidelberg, Germany: Carl-Auer-Systeme Verlag.
 Hellinger, B. (2003). Rachel Weeping for Her Children: Family Constellations in Israel Heidelberg, Germany: Carl-Auer-International.
 Hellinger, B. (2003).  Peace begins in the soul: Family constellations in the service of reconciliation (C. Beaumont, Trans.).  Heidelberg, Germany: Carl-Auer-Systeme Verlag.
 Hellinger, B. (2006). No waves without the ocean: Experiences and thoughts (J. ten Herkel & S. Tombleson, Trans.).  Heidelberg, Germany: Carl-Auer-Systeme Verlag.
 Hellinger, B. (2007). With God in mind.  Berchtesgaden, Germany: Hellinger Publications.
Hellinger, B. (2009). Natural Transcendence. Hellinger publications.
 Hellinger, B. & ten Hövel, G. (1999).  Acknowledging what is: Conversations with Bert Hellinger.  Phoenix, AZ: Zeig, Tucker & Theisen.
 Hellinger, B., Weber, G., & Beaumont, H. (1998).  Love's hidden symmetry: What makes love work in relationships.  Phoenix, AZ: Zeig, Tucker & Theisen.

In German:

 Zweierlei Glück. Konzept und Praxis der systemischen Psychotherapie (1993)
 Ordnungen der Liebe (1994)
 Die Mitte fühlt sich leicht an (1996)
 Wo Schicksal wirkt und Demut heilt - ein Kurs für Kranke
 Wie Liebe gelingt (1999)
 mit Gabriele ten Hövel - Anerkennen, was ist. Gespräche über Verstrickung und Heilung
 Mit der Seele gehen
 Ordnungen des Helfens - Über die Ordnungen und Unordnungen sinnvollen professionellen Helfens
 Gedanken unterwegs
 Gottesgedanken - Ihre Wurzeln und ihre Wirkungen (2004)
 Wahrheit in Bewegung
 Der große Konflikt
 Ein langer Weg - Biographie (2005)
 Rachel weint um ihre Kinder - Familien-Stellen mit Überlebenden des Holocaust. Vorwort v. Haim Dasberg (Herder Verlag 3/2004)

See also 

 Family Constellations

References

External links
 hellinger.com Official page

20th-century German Roman Catholic priests
German psychologists
People from Leimen (Baden)
1925 births
2019 deaths
Pseudoscientific psychologists
German Army personnel of World War II
German prisoners of war in World War II
German escapees